A relish is a cooked and pickled product made of chopped vegetables, fruits or herbs and is a food item typically used as a condiment to enhance a staple. Examples are chutneys and the North American relish, a pickled cucumber jam eaten with hot dogs. In North America, the word "relish" is frequently used to describe a single variety of finely-chopped pickled cucumber relish, such as pickle, dill and sweet relishes.

Relish generally consists of discernible vegetable or fruit pieces in a sauce, although the sauce is subordinate in character to the vegetable or fruit pieces. Herbs may also be used, and some relishes, such as chermoula, are prepared entirely using herbs and spices. Relish can consist of a single type or a combination of vegetables and fruit, which may be coarsely or finely chopped; its texture will vary depending on the slicing style used for these solid ingredients, but generally a relish is not as smooth as a sauce-type condiment such as ketchup. Relish typically has a strong flavor that complements or adds to the primary food item with which it is served.

Varieties 

This is a list of notable relishes.

 Ajika
 Ajvar
 Achar
 Atchara
 Bostongurka
 Biber salçası
 Branston relish
 Chakalaka
 Chermoula
 Chow-chow
 Chrain
 Chutney
 Cranberry relish
 Ćwikła – Polish beet relish
 Dill relish
 Doenjang
 Gentleman's Relish – was invented in 1828 by John Osborn and contains spiced anchovy. It is traditionally spread sparingly atop unsalted butter on toast.
 Giardiniera
 Gochujang
 India relish
 Lecsó
 Ljutenica
 Kachumbari – common in East Africa
 Kimchi relish – prepared using kimchi as a main ingredient
 Kyopolou
 Kuchela
 Mango pickle
 Mixed pickles
 Mostarda – prepared as a relish, fruit pickle, fruit preserve or chutney
 Muhammara
 Matbucha
 Pear relish
 Pebre
 Piccalilli
 Pickled cucumber
 Pico de gallo
 Pinđur
 Salsa
 Tapenade
 Vinagrete

In the United States, the most common commercially available relishes are made from pickled cucumbers and are known in the food trade as pickle relishes. Pickle relish is one of the most commonly used spreads in the U.S. Two variants of this are hamburger relish (pickle relish in a ketchup base or sauce) and hot dog relish (pickle relish in a mustard base or sauce). Another readily available commercial relish in the U.S. is corn (maize) relish.  Heinz, Vlasic, and Claussen are well known in the U.S. as producers of pickled cucumbers and pickle relishes. Chicago-style relish is a sweet pickle relish that is a standard ingredient on the Chicago-style hot dog. Pickle relish is an important ingredient in many varieties of the U.S. version of tartar sauce.

See also 

  – a liquid condiment

References

Further reading

External links 

 USDA Standards for Grades of Pickles (including relishes) 
 Relishes at recipe source

Condiments
Pickles
Sauces
Fruit dishes
Vegetable dishes